Katemjan-e Seyyed Abd ol Vahhabi (also Romanized as Katemjan-e Seyyed ‘Abd ol Vahhābī ; also known as Kotamjān-e Seyyed ‘Abd ol Vahhāb and Kowtamjān) is a village in Ziabar Rural District, in the Central District of Sowme'eh Sara County, Gilan Province, Iran. At the 2006 census, its population was 127, in 42 families.

References 

Populated places in Sowme'eh Sara County